Eugène Péreire (1 October 1831 – 	21 March 1908) was a French financier and politician of Sephardic Jewish origin. The son of Isaac Péreire of the prominent Péreire brothers, he founded Banque Transatlantique in 1881.

In 1857, Péreire married Juliette Fould of the Fould family. They had two daughters:
 Alice Pereire (1858–1931), married to Salomon Halfon, President of Banque Transatlantique 1909–23
 Marie Pereire (1860–1936), married to Jules Halphen, son of Eugène Halphen of the Halphen family

Péreire was a member of parliament for the Department Tarn from 1863 to 1869.

References 

1831 births
1908 deaths
French financiers
19th-century French Sephardi Jews
Pereire family
Fould family